Tianjin Pipe (Group) Corporation Limited known as Tianjin Pipe or its abbreviation TPCO, is the largest stemless steel pipe maker of China as well as one of the largest in the world.

History
The predecessor of Tianjin Pipe was founded on 11 December 1987 (as ); it was one of the project in the Eighth Five-Year Plan of China. The factory was later incorporated as a limited company, under a law that was established in 1993. In 1999 the corporation fall under control by the Ministry of Finance of the People's Republic of China due to debt-to-equity swap, which the four state-owned asset management companies or bad banks, Huarong, Cinda, Great Wall and Orient Asset Management owned 100% stake. In 2006 TPCO became a "company limited by shares". In 2007 Bohai Industrial Investment Fund acquired a minority stake of TPCO from Tianjin Pipe Investment Holding. In 2010 Tianjin Pipe Investment Holding became a subsidiary of Bohai Steel Group, another Tianjin SASAC supervising entity. In April 2016, due to the dissolution of Bohai Steel Group, the shares of Tianjin Pipe Investment Holding was transferred to Bohai State-owned Assets Administration Co., Ltd, a wholly owned subsidiary of Tianjin Jinlian Investment Holding, another state-owned enterprise that was supervised by Tianjin SASAC.

TPCO had one of the largest Chinese industrial investment in the United States. TPCO America had a share capital of US$298,610,935.84, build a new plant located in Gregory, Texas. However, it was reported that TPCO signed a tax incentive deal with Gregory-Portland Independent School District (GPISD), which supposed requiring the subsidiary to employ local population. However, the company refused to do so, paying fines and request to cancel the deal instead.

Joint Venture
Tianjin Pipe Corporation formed a joint venture with Huaigang Special Steel. TPCO owned 60% stake. Huaigang sold the stake to a third part in 2015. Tianjin Pipe Corporation also formed two joint ventures Tianjin TISCO & TPCO Stainless Steel and Tianjin TPCO & TISCO Welding Pipe with Taigang Stainless Steel in a 35–65 ratio (via a subsidiary) and 50-50 ratio respectively.

Subsidiaries

 TPCO America (100%)
 TPCO Enterprise (90%)
 TPCO Gulf PZE (100%)
 TPCO Panasia (51%)
 PT TPCO Panasia PTE Ltd. (100%)
 Tianjin Pipe Corporation (Middle East) Ltd. (51%)
  (100%)
  (100%)

  (100%)
  (100%)
  (100%)
  (100%)
  (100%)
  (70%)
  (100%)
  (100%)

  (99.05%)
  (100%)
  (50%)
  (60%)
  (85%)
  (50%)
  (100%)

Shareholders

  (84.27%)
 via wholly owned subsidiary TEDA Holding (57.00%)
 via wholly owned subsidiary Tianjin Pipe Investment Holding of Tianjin Bohai State-owned Assets Administration (27.27%)
 a consortium of the Ministry of Finance of the People's Republic of China (10%)
 China Cinda Asset Management (6.11%)
 China Orient Asset Management (3.03%)
 China Great Wall Asset Management (0.43%)
 China Huarong Asset Management (0.43%)
 Bohai Industrial Investment Fund (5.73%)

See also
 Tianjin Pipe Corporation Station, metro station

References

External links
  
 TPCO Enterprise 
 TPCO America 

Steel companies of China
Manufacturing companies based in Tianjin
Manufacturing companies established in 1987
Chinese companies established in 1987
Companies owned by the provincial government of China
China Orient Asset Management
1987 establishments in China